West Pinjarra is a suburb of the town of Pinjarra in the Peel Region of Western Australia. Its local government area is the Shire of Murray.

It is a predominantly industrial suburb, with many engineering and manufacturing facilities located there. It is connected to other parts of the state by the Forrest Highway and Pinjarra Road.

References

Towns in Western Australia
Shire of Murray